Malda is a village in West Champaran district in the Indian state of Bihar.

Demographics
As of 2011 India census, Malda had a population of 1367 in 243 households. Males constitute 52.81% of the population and females 47.18%. Malda has an average literacy rate of 53.84%, lower than the national average of 74%: male literacy is 63.31%, and female literacy is 36.68%. In Malda, 21.2% of the population is under 6 years of age.

References

Villages in West Champaran district